Song Zhiwen (c. 660–712), also known by his courtesy name of Yanqing, was a Chinese poet of the early Tang dynasty, although technically his poetic career was largely within the anomalous dynastic interregnum of Wu Zetian. Together with Shen Quanqi, Song Zhiwen is considered to have the "credit for the final perfection" of the "new style" poetry of regulated verse (jintishi) which was one of the most critical poetic developments of the early Tang poets, and much followed as a style which inspired future generations of poets.

He was ordered to commit suicide after Xuanzong came to the throne, ostensibly because of unwise involvement in the politics of the imperial succession.

Poetry
Song Zhiwen was particularly known for his five-character-regular-verse, or wujue, one of which is included in the famous poetry anthology Three Hundred Tang Poems.

As an outstanding court poet in Early Tang dynasty, Song Zhiwen's poems are famous for his regulated verse which are regarded as lüshi, including heptasyllabic songs. His early opuses  focus on court life and imperially assigned poems. Later, he prefers to write landscapes and inner embitterment feelings due to exile. His most famous poems are "度大庾岭" (A.D.705) and "渡汉江" (Crossing the Han River, A.D.706). Actually, he rather creates court poems than other topics when he stays in the royal circle, while composing lyrics instead when he is banished from the capital.

See also
Classical Chinese poetry forms
Regulated verse
Lantian County
Wangchuanji

Notes

References
Davis, A. R. (Albert Richard), Editor and Introduction, (1970), The Penguin Book of Chinese Verse. (Baltimore: Penguin Books).
Stephen Owen, "The Poetry of Early T'ang",New York:Yale University Press, 1977

External links
 
Books of the Quan Tangshi that include collected poems of Song Zhiwen at the Chinese Text Project:
Book 51
Book 52
Book 53

Three Hundred Tang Poems poets
Forced suicides of Chinese people
Politicians from Lüliang
Poets from Shanxi
Year of birth uncertain
710 deaths
Tang dynasty politicians from Shanxi
Executed Tang dynasty people
8th-century executions by the Tang dynasty
Executed people from Shanxi
7th-century Chinese poets
8th-century Chinese poets